Paul Nandapi (born 21 December 1961) is a retired Australian discus thrower.

He finished sixth at the 1985 World Cup, won the bronze medal at the 1985 Pacific Conference Games, the silver medal at the 1986 Commonwealth Games, finished fifth at the 1989 World Cup and won the bronze medal at the 1990 Commonwealth Games.

Nandapi became Australian champion in the years 1983–1987. His personal best throw was 62.66 metres, achieved in December 1987 in Canberra.

References

1961 births
Living people
Australian male discus throwers
Athletes (track and field) at the 1986 Commonwealth Games
Athletes (track and field) at the 1990 Commonwealth Games
Commonwealth Games bronze medallists for Australia
Commonwealth Games medallists in athletics
Medallists at the 1986 Commonwealth Games
Medallists at the 1990 Commonwealth Games